Paerātā railway station is an under construction railway station in Auckland, New Zealand. It is due to open in 2025 as part of the Auckland railway electrification project. It will serve the Paerata area, linking with the new Paerata Rise housing development. The station will be located on the existing rail line, adjacent to the planned eastern extent of the development.

History
The rural community of Paerata was served by Paerata railway station from 1875 until 1972. This station was located one kilometre to the south of the modern station.

As part of the New Zealand Upgrade Programme, Jacinda Ardern's government announced $371 million in funding towards the electrification of track from Papakura to Pukekohe, and a separate $247 million towards the construction of two new stations in Drury Central and Drury West. This was later expanded to include a third station at Paerata.

Planning consent was granted for the Drury Central and Paerata stations in February 2022, with further work being undertaken to gain approval for the Drury West station.

The new stations have attracted criticism from public transport advocates, who say that they are too designed for auto-dependency.

In May 2022, KiwiRail and Auckland Transport announced proposed names for the three stations, replacing the placeholder names of Paerata, Drury West, and Drury Central. These names were gifted by mana whenua, in order to restore the original te reo Māori names of the area. The placeholder name of Paerata was replaced by Paeraataa, reflecting the preference of Waikato Tainui for using double vowels instead of macrons to indicate vowel length. The name derives from a conflation of 'pae', a Māori word meaning 'a ridge or resting place', and 'raataa', referring to a rātā tree.

In August 2022, the New Zealand Geographic Board returned its verdict on the name, rejecting the use of double vowels as preferred by the Mana Whenua Forum, and instead recommending the name 'Paerātā', in line with national and te reo Māori orthographic standards. The iwi involved expressed strong dislike of the decision, saying that standardisation of the written form is a loss of their identity and homogenisation of culture, and that they want their children to not be penalised in schools and to learn written te reo Māori in their regional form. The public consultations on the name change ran until early November that year. The Board's recommended name was approved by the Land Information Minister Damien O'Connor in March 2023.

References

Proposed railway stations in New Zealand
Rail transport in Auckland
Railway stations in New Zealand
Railway stations scheduled to open in 2025